Xantal Giné (born 23 September 1992) is a Spanish field hockey defender who competed in the 2016 Summer Olympics.

References

External links
 

1992 births
Living people
Spanish female field hockey players
Olympic field hockey players of Spain
Field hockey players at the 2016 Summer Olympics
Female field hockey defenders
Field hockey players at the 2020 Summer Olympics